"Squirt" is a single by the English electronic music band Fluke, released on 14 July 1997 at Circa and Virgin Records.

Amongst the Squirt versions there are two known releases which have mislabeled tracks. The version YRCDX127 has a mislabeled track where Squirt (Pdfmone) is actually Slid (Pdfmone) and YRT127 is labeled by some discographies as a mis-press: "On the cover (picture sleeve) the tracks are written as above, but on the innerlabel it's written: A SIDE: A01 Squirt (full vox) A02 Squirt (the europicolamix) B SIDE: B01 Slid (modwheel mix) B02 Squirt (remixed by dub)"

Versions

References 

Fluke (band) songs
1997 songs